is a Japanese monthly seinen manga magazine published by Shueisha under the Jump line of magazines. Originally, the magazine was a special issue of Weekly Young Jump which was first issued in 1995. On October 19, 1999, the special issue became the new monthly publication Ultra Jump. The manga titles serialized in the magazine are published in tankōbon volumes under the Young Jump Comics Ultra label.

History
Ultra Jump started as a special issue of the seinen anthology Weekly Young Jump called "Young Jump: Ultra Special Issue: Ultra Jump", which was first issued in 1995. The magazine was split to a monthly publication in 1999, simply called "Ultra Jump". On March 19, 2008, Ultra Jump released an online spin-off of the Ultra Jump magazine: . Ultra Jump Egg is an online manga website that mainly serializes manga not in the original Ultra Jump magazine.

Features

The magazine has been known for fanservice-laden fantasy and science-fiction stories aimed at young adults. Shueisha's light novel line, "Super Dash Bunko", has close ties with the Ultra Jump magazine, as Ultra Jump supports the line by creating manga adaptions of the titles. (e.g. R.O.D) One-shots from manga writers are featured regularly and are called . Each issue includes an item featuring one or more series currently running in the magazine.

Series in publication

References

External links
Shueisha's Ultra Jump page 
Shueisha's Ultra Jump Egg page 

1999 establishments in Japan
Magazines established in 1999
Magazines published in Tokyo
Monthly manga magazines published in Japan
Seinen manga magazines
Shueisha magazines